Makere may refer to:

Makere, Kenya, a settlement in Coast Province, Kenya
Makere people, an ethnic group of the Democratic Republic of Congo

See also
Makerere, a neighborhood in Kampala, Uganda
Maatkare, a name shared by several royal women from Ancient Egypt